

PMPC Star Awards for Television

Anvil Awards

MTRCB Awards

PUP Mabini Media Awards

PMAP Makatao Awards

Anak TV Seal Awards

Catholic Mass Media Awards

Gawad Tanglaw Awards

Asian TV Awards

UPLB Gandingan Awards

USTv Students Choice Awards

KBP Golden Dove Awards

Yahoo! Philippines OMG! Awards

Bataan Peninsula State University: Kagitingan Awards

References

TV Patrol